Lucky Man is the seventh studio album by American country music singer Hal Ketchum. It was released by Curb Records on September 4, 2001.

Critical reception

AllMusic's review states, "There's a fairly high soul quotient here that puts Ketchum more in line with the likes of Jim Lauderdale (or at least Lee Roy Parnell) than with any hat act."

Rick Bell writes in his Country Standard Time review that, "Ketchum's latest is a solid effort."

Kirsten Swanson of Variety writes, "With his Lucky Man CD released just two weeks ago, Hal Ketchum is hoping the timing is perfect for this country to be looking for an upbeat country album."

Chet Flippo of MTV and CMT begins his review with, "Hal Ketchum's first album of new material in more than two years leads this week's new album releases."

Track listing

Track information adapted from the album's liner notes.

Personnel

Al Anderson (tracks 1, 2, 10), Biff Watson (tracks 1, 2, 6, 7, 10, 12), Chris Rodriguez (tracks 8, 9), Larry Byrom (tracks 11) - acoustic guitar
Al Anderson (tracks 3), Brent Mason (tracks 3, 4, 6 ), Larry Byrom (tracks 11) - gut-string acoustic guitar
John Hobbs (tracks 4, 8, 11) - string arrangements
Andrew Gold (tracks 6), Bekka Bramlett (tracks 3, 12), Dewayne Bryant, Eddie K (tracks 5), Greg Cook (4) (tracks 5), Harry Stinson (tracks 2, 7, 12), Heath Wright (tracks 5), John Cowan (tracks 1, 4, 7, 9), John Davis (tracks 10), Marcia Ramirez (tracks 6), Tim Chewning (tracks 5), Vince Santoro (tracks 1, 2, 9, 12) - backing vocals
Steuart Smith (tracks 9) - electric baritone guitar
Michael Rhodes (tracks 4, 5, 7 – 12), Willie Weeks (tracks 1 – 3, 6) - bass
John Hobbs (tracks 11) - celesta
Steve Conn (tracks 6) - concertina
Congas – Eric Darkin (tracks 4) - congas
Paul Leim (tracks 11) - drum programming, drums
Brent Mason (tracks 1, 4, 7, 10, 12), Jerry McPherson (tracks 11), Kenny Vaughan (2) (tracks 4), Steuart Smith (tracks 8) - electric guitar
Stuart Duncan (tracks 9) - fiddle
Biff Watson (tracks 3) - hi-string guitar
Timothy B. Schmit (tracks 8) - harmony vocals
John Hobbs (tracks 3, 4, 9), Tony Harrell (tracks 2) - keyboards
Dan Dugmore (tracks 11) - mandolin
John Hobbs (tracks 12), Tony Harrell (tracks 6) - organ
John Hobbs (tracks 4, 5, 7, 8, 10, 11), Tony Harrell (tracks 1, 12) - piano
Jerry Douglas (tracks 6) - dobro resonator guitar
Jerry Douglas (tracks 2) - electric slide guitar
Dan Dugmore (tracks 11), Paul Franklin (tracks 1, 3, 4, 7, 10) - steel guitar
Technical
Mixed By [Mixing Engineer] – Steve MarcAntonio
Producer – Lisa Brokop (tracks 11), Paul Leim (tracks 11), Rodney Crowell (tracks 1 – 10, 12)
Engineer [Additional Recording] – Greg Ladanyi
Engineer [Recording] – Donivan Cowart, Roger Moutenot, Steve MarcAntonio
Creative Director – Sue Astin
Design – Glenn Sweitzer
Art Direction – Glenn Sweitzer
Photography By – Señor McGuire

Personnel adapted from Discogs.

References

2001 albums
Hal Ketchum albums
Curb Records albums
Albums produced by Rodney Crowell